A Vindication of Natural Society: or, a View of the Miseries and Evils arising to Mankind from every Species of Artificial Society is a work by Edmund Burke published in 1756. It is a satire of Lord Bolingbroke's deism. Burke confronted Bolingbroke not in the sphere of religion but civil society and government, arguing that his arguments against revealed religion could apply to all institutions. So close to Bolingbroke's style was the work, that Burke's ironic intention was missed by some readers, leading Burke in his preface to the second edition (1757) to make plain that it was a satire. Nonetheless, this work was considered by William Godwin to be the first literary expression of philosophical anarchism.

Satire
Most historians believe Vindication was intended as satire, but some others disagree. For example, Murray Rothbard argues that Burke wrote the Vindication in earnest but later wished to disavow it for political reasons. Rothbard's argument is based on a misunderstanding. He believes it took nine years (until 1765) for Edmund Burke to divulge that he was the author of the work, and only claimed it to be a satire to save his then spawning political career. In reality Edmund Burke reveals both his authorship and claims the book as a satire in the preface to its second edition published in 1757, long before he would embark upon a political career.

Among passages that have been taken both as Swiftian irony and as a theoretical realization of the danger such controversial opinions may have upon a career is:

Content

The preface presents the occasion of the essay as a riposte to the philosophy of Henry St John, 1st Viscount Bolingbroke (died 1751), whose Collected Works and Letters had been published by David Mallet in 5 volumes in 1754. A new preface was written by Burke after his authorship was discovered. In this apologetic preface, he wrote that Vindication was inspired by "seeing every Mode of Religion attacked in a lively Manner, and the Foundation of every Virtue, and of all Government, sapped with great Art and much Ingenuity" in Lord Bolingbroke's collected Works. This author's design has been to show

The author contrasts Natural Society with Political Society beginning with a distrust of the Mind, which "every Day invents some new artificial Rule to guide that Nature which if left to itself were the best and surest Guide". He proposes to set out to identify those "unalterable Relations which Providence has ordained that every thing should bear to every other. These Relations, which are Truth itself, the Foundation of Virtue, and consequently, the only Measures of Happiness."

In the spirit of the Age of Enlightenment, the author expresses every confidence in the cumulative Progress of the human condition:

In a swift survey of history, he finds nothing but "Tumults, Rebellions, Massacres, Assassinations, Proscriptions, and a Series of Horror" and remarks that "All Empires have been cemented in Blood" as the casualties mount in the millions, with cruelties perfected  by technology.

Contrasted with natural Liberty and natural Religion, the author sets three general forms of government, which he describes with the same emphatic detail as used in the Satires of Juvenal: Despotism, the simplest and most universal, where "unbounded Power proceeds Step by Step, until it has eradicated every laudable Principle"; Aristocracy, which is scarcely better, as "a Genoese, or a Venetian Republick, is a concealed Despotism"; and giddy Democracy, where the common people are "intoxicated with the Flatteries of their Orators":

Having employed fulminating rhetoric to dispense with the artificial Political Societies—"after so fair an Examen, wherein nothing has been exaggerated; no Fact produced which cannot be proved"—the author, it might be expected, will turn to his idea of Natural Society for contrast. Instead, he turns his critical eye upon the Mixed government, which combines monarchy, aristocracy and a tempered democracy, the form of politics this essay's British readers would immediately identify as their own. His satirist's view takes it all in, painting once again in broad strokes the dilemmas of the law courts or the dissatisfactions of wealth, and closes— without actually having vindicated natural society at all.

Embedded in the whirl of extravagant invective, Burke is able, like all writers of Menippean satire, to express some subversive criticism:

See also
Noble savage

Notes

References
On-line text
(Edmund Burke), A Vindication of Natural Society: A View of the Miseries and Evils Arising to Mankind (Liberty Fund, 1982) .

Further reading
"A Note on Burke's Vindication of Natural Society". Journal of the History of Ideas 19 (1):114-118
 John C. Weston, Jr. (1958). "The Ironic Purpose of Burke's Vindication Vindicated". Journal of the History of Ideas 19 (3):435-441
 Frank N. Pagano (1985). Burke's View of the Evils of Political Theory: Or, "A Vindication of Natural Society". Polity 17 (3):446-462

18th-century essays
1756 books
Books about anarchism
British political satire
English-language books
English non-fiction books
Works by Edmund Burke